The New Providence FA Cup is the top knockout tournament of the New Providence, Bahamas football.

Winners 
Winners were: 
1999/00 : Cavalier FC
2000/01 : Cavalier FC
2001/02 : JJ Johnson United
2002/03 : Bears FC
2003/04 : Bears FC
2004/05 : not known
2005/06 : Bears FC
2006/07 : Bears FC
2007/08 : FC Nassau
2008/09 : Bears FC
2009/10 : JJ Johnson United
2010/11 : Cavalier FC
2011/12 : Bears FC
2012–14 : not known
2014/15: Western Warriors SC
2015/16: Western Warriors SC

References

Football competitions in the Bahamas